Loel E. Bennett Stadium is a stadium in Winchester, Tennessee.  It is primarily used for baseball and was the home of Tennessee T's of the All-American Association as well as the Tennessee Tomahawks of the Heartland League and Big South Leagues. The ballpark has a capacity of 2,500 people and opened in 1993.

References 

Sports venues in Tennessee
Minor league baseball venues
Buildings and structures in Franklin County, Tennessee
Sports venues completed in 1993
1993 establishments in Tennessee
Winchester, Tennessee